The 2011 Norwegian Figure Skating Championships was held in Hamar from January 14 to 16, 2011. Skaters competed in the discipline of single skating. The results were used to choose the teams to the 2011 World Championships, the 2011 European Championships, the 2011 Nordic Championships, and the 2011 World Junior Championships.

Senior results

Ladies

External links
 2011 Norwegian Championships results

Norwegian Figure Skating Championships
Norwegian Figure Skating Championships, 2011
2011 in Norwegian sport